†Naricopsinidae was an extinct family of fossil operculate  gastropod mollusks in the informal group Architaenioglossa.

This family has no subfamilies according to the taxonomy of the Gastropoda by Bouchet & Rocroi, 2005.

References 

Prehistoric gastropods